Giovanni Battista Belzoni (5 November 1778 – 3 December 1823), sometimes known as The Great Belzoni, was a prolific Italian explorer and pioneer archaeologist of Egyptian antiquities. He is known for his removal to England of the seven-tonne bust of Ramesses II, the clearing of sand from the entrance of the great temple at Abu Simbel, the discovery and documentation of the tomb of Seti I (still sometimes known as "Belzoni's Tomb"), including the Sarcophagus of Seti I, and the first to penetrate into the Pyramid of Khafre, the second pyramid of the Giza complex.

Early life
Belzoni was born in Padua. His father was a barber who sired fourteen children. His family was from Rome and when Belzoni was 16 he went to work there, saying that he studied hydraulics. He intended on taking monastic vows, but in 1798 the occupation of the city by French troops drove him from Rome and changed his proposed career. In 1800 he moved to the Batavian Republic (now Netherlands) where he earned a living as a barber.

In 1803 he fled to England to avoid being sent to jail. There he married an Englishwoman, Sarah Banne. They were for some time compelled to subsist by performing exhibitions of feats of strength and agility as a strongman at fairs and on the streets of London. In 1804 he appears engaged at the circus at Astley's Amphitheatre at a variety of performances. Belzoni had an interest in phantasmagoria and experimented with the use of magic lanterns in his shows.

Egyptian antiquities

In 1812 he left England and after a tour of performances in Spain, Portugal and Sicily, he went to Malta in 1815 where he met Ismael Gibraltar, an emissary of Muhammad Ali, the Pasha of Egypt, who at the time was undertaking a programme of agrarian land reclamation and important irrigation works. Belzoni wanted to show Muhammad Ali a hydraulic machine of his own invention for raising the waters of the Nile. Though the experiment with this engine was successful, the project was not approved by the pasha. Belzoni, now without a job, was resolved to continue his travels. 

On the recommendation of the orientalist J. L. Burckhardt he was sent by Henry Salt, the British consul to Egypt, to the Ramesseum at Thebes, from where he removed with great skill the colossal bust of Ramesses II, commonly called the "Younger Memnon". Shipped by Belzoni to England, this piece is still on prominent display at the British Museum in London. This weighed over 7 tons. It took him 17 days and 130 men to tow it to the river. He used levers to lift it onto rollers. Then he had his men distributed equally with four ropes drag it on the rollers. On the first day (27 July) he covered only a few yards, but on the second he covered 50 yards, deliberately breaking the bases of two columns to clear the way for his burden. After 150 yards, it sank into the sand, and a detour of 300 yards on firmer ground was necessary. From there, it got a little easier, and, on 12 August he finally reached the river, where he was able to load it onto a boat for shipment to England. His excavation and removal of the Younger Memnon and other stones during this expedition was explicitly authorized by a firman from Muhammad Ali himself.

He also expanded his investigations to the great temple of Edfu, visited Elephantine island and Philae, cleared the entrance of the great temple at Abu Simbel of sand (1817), made excavations at Karnak, and opened up the sepulchre of Seti I (still sometimes known as "Belzoni's Tomb") in the Valley of the Kings. He was the first to penetrate into the Pyramid of Khafre, the second pyramid of the Giza complex, and the first European in modern times to visit the Bahariya Oasis. He also identified the ruins of Berenice on the Red Sea.

In 1819 he returned to England and published an account of his travels and discoveries entitled Narrative of the Operations and Recent Discoveries within the Pyramids, Temples, Tombs and Excavations in Egypt and Nubia, &c the following year. During 1820 and 1821 he also exhibited facsimiles of the tomb of Seti I. The exhibition was held at the Egyptian Hall, Piccadilly, London. In 1822 Belzoni showed his model in Paris.

In 1823 he set out for West Africa, intending to travel to Timbuktu. Having been refused permission to pass through Morocco, he chose the Gulf of Guinea coastal route. He reached the Kingdom of Benin, but was seized with dysentery at a village called Gwato (now Ughoton), and died there. According to the celebrated traveller Richard Francis Burton he was murdered and robbed. In 1829 his widow published his drawings of the royal tombs at Thebes.

Commemoration

A medal depicting a profile of Belzoni created by William Brockedon was cast in 1821 by Sir Edward Thomason. Belzoni’s friend Sir Francis Ronalds had introduced artist and subject. Years later, in 1859 in Padua, Ronalds advised sculptor Rinaldo Rinaldi on the large medallion he was creating to commemorate Belzoni in his hometown.

Belzoni was portrayed by Matthew Kelly in the 2005 BBC docudrama Egypt.

Alberto Siliotti completed a unique scholarly edition of his travel writing, and it was subject of the Horus expedition in 1988.

Horace Smith, a poet in the circle of Percy Bysshe Shelley, wrote " Address to the Mummy in Belzoni's Exhibition."

See also

List of megalithic sites
Howard Carter
Flinders Petrie
Anastasini Circus

Notes

References

Catholic Encyclopedia article
2001, Belzoni’s Travels, by Alberto Siliotti, The British Museum Press,

Further reading
 Mayes, Stanley. The Great Belzoni: The Circus Strongman Who Discovered Egypt`s Treasures. Tauris Parke Paperbacks (2003). 
 Noël Hume, Ivor. Belzoni: The Giant Archaeologists Love to Hate. University of Virginia Press (2011). 
 Siliotti, Alberto. Belzoni’s Travels. (2001) The British Museum Press, 
 Jasanoff, Maya. Edge of Empire: Lives, Culture, and Conquest in the East, 1750-1850. (2005) Random House, 
 Ronalds, B.F. Sir Francis Ronalds: Father of the Electric Telegraph, Imperial College Press (2016),  - describes the creation of Belzoni's likeness
 Disher, Maurice Willson. Pharoah's Fool. Heinemann (1957)
 Zatterin, Marco. "Il Gigante del Nilo" Mondadori (2000), Il Mulino (2008), Mondadori (2019)
 Gaia Servadio  L'Italiano piu’ famoso del mondo Bompiani. (2018)

External links 

 

1778 births
1823 deaths
19th-century archaeologists
People from Padua
Italian antiquarians
Italian archaeologists
Italian Egyptologists
Italian Roman Catholics
Explorers from the Republic of Venice
Explorers of Africa
People associated with the British Museum
19th-century Italian people
19th-century antiquarians
Abu Simbel